Friedrich Eduard Traffelet, popularly Fritz Traffelet (1897–1954) was a Bernese painter and illustrator.

After studies in Zürich and Paris, he married Alice Rondi in 1921. In the 1930s, Traffelet gained renown as a military painter and served in the Swiss Army during World War II from 1939 to 1945. Done in a 19th-century style, his paintings and illustrations of soldierly life have become defining images of Switzerland in World War II.

In the 1940s and 1950s, Traffelet also executed a wide range of portraits, landscape paintings and facade paintings. They most often depict historic or traditional genre scenes, reflecting his generally conservative outlook.

References

External links
 Artnet entry for Friedrich Traffelet

1897 births
1954 deaths
20th-century Swiss painters
Swiss male painters
Artists from Bern
Swiss military personnel
20th-century Swiss male artists